Alejandro Rebollo Ceñal (born 11 January 1983 in Gijón, Asturias) is a Spanish retired footballer who played as a goalkeeper.

External links

1983 births
Living people
Footballers from Gijón
Spanish footballers
Association football goalkeepers
Segunda División players
Segunda División B players
Tercera División players
Real Oviedo Vetusta players
UD San Sebastián de los Reyes players
Getafe CF B players
Granada CF footballers
Lorca Deportiva CF footballers
CF Palencia footballers
FC Cartagena footballers
Real Avilés CF footballers